Hokkaido Kitami Hokuto High School (北海道北見北斗高等学校, Hokkaidō Kitami Hokuto Kōtō Gakkō) is a high school in Kitami, Hokkaido, Japan, founded in 1922. Hokkaido Kitami Hokuto High School is one of high schools administrated by Hokkaido.

The school is operated by the Hokkaido Prefectural Board of Education.

Notable alumni
Akio Sugino (杉野 昭夫) Anime Director, Character Designer, and Screenwriter.
Umeji Sasaki (佐々木 梅治)  Actor and Voice Actor.
Satsuki Fujisawa (藤澤 五月) Curler.

Address and access
 Address: Hokuto-cho 1-choume-1, Kitami, Hokkaido
 Access: Hokkaido Kitami Bus - Hokuto Kōkō Bus stop (北斗高校)

External links
Official Website of Hokkaido Kitami Hokuto High School

High schools in Hokkaido
Educational institutions established in 1922
1922 establishments in Japan